Get Down may refer to:

 Get down, a stance or movement in traditional African culture, in African American culture, and throughout the Black African diaspora

Film and television
 Get Down (film) or Treed Murray, a 2001 Canadian film
 The Get Down, an American musical drama television series

Music

Albums
 Get Down (album), by Joe Simon (1975)
 Get Down! (album), by Soulive (1999)
 The Get Down (soundtrack), from the television series (2016)
 Get Down!, by The Hi-Fives (1998)

Songs
 "Get Down" (b4-4 song) (2000)
 "Get Down" (Craig Mack song) (1994)
 "Get Down" (Gilbert O'Sullivan song) (1973)
 "Get Down" (Groove Armada song) (2007)
 "Get Down" (James Arthur song) (2014)
 "Get Down" (Laurent Wéry song) (2010)
 "Get Down" (Nas song) (2003)
 "Get Down" (Tiësto and Tony Junior song) (2015)
 "Get Down (You're the One for Me)", a song by the Backstreet Boys (1996)
 "Get Down", by Audio Adrenaline from Underdog
 "Get Down", by Badfinger from No Dice
 "Get Down", by Big Daddy Kane from Prince of Darkness
 "Get Down", by Blue from One Love
 "Get Down", by Busta Rhymes from The Big Bang
 "Get Down", by the Butthole Surfers from Weird Revolution
 "Get Down", by Cam'ron from Purple Haze
 "Get Down", by Curtis Mayfield from Roots
 "Get Down", by Emmalyn Estrada
 "Get Down", by Everlast from Whitey Ford Sings the Blues
 "Get Down", by G-Unit from T.O.S: Terminate on Sight
 "Get Down", by Gene Chandler
 "Get Down", by Gotthard from their self-titled debut album
 "Get Down", by Hardwell and W&W
 "Get Down", by Lil Wayne from Tha Carter
 "Get Down", by LL Cool J from Bigger and Deffer
 "Get Down", by M-D-Emm
 "Get Down", by Monica from Miss Thang
 "Get Down", by War from All Day Music
 "Get Down", from the musical Six (musical)

See also
 "Get Down Saturday Night", a song by Oliver Cheatham
 "Get Down Tonight", a song by KC and the Sunshine Band
 "Get Down, Get Down (Get on the Floor)", a song by Joe Simon
 "To Get Down", a song by Timo Maas